Katalin Burián (born 17 January 1995) is a Hungarian swimmer. She competed in the women's 200 metre backstroke event at the 2017 World Aquatics Championships, placing 10th.

References

1995 births
Living people
Hungarian female swimmers
Swimmers from Budapest
Hungarian female backstroke swimmers
European Aquatics Championships medalists in swimming
Swimmers at the 2020 Summer Olympics
Olympic swimmers of Hungary